Getty Herschel Huffine (August 25, 1889 – February 12, 1947) was an American music composer, trombonist and tuba player. He was born in Bowling Green, Kentucky, on August 25, 1889, the eldest of four children.

He was employed at an axe handle factory and, when the Bowling Green town band was organized in 1907, he was accepted on the condition that he play valve trombone, a trombone with a fixed slide and valves such as a euphonium. He was a self-taught musician. During the next five years Huffine taught himself tuba as well as the basics of harmony, counterpoint and composition. It is reputed that he spent his mature years as a tubist in professional bands (including Patrick Conway's Band) and possibly circus bands. It is reputed that he worked for C. L. Barnhouse as a music engraver, however there are no substantiating records. In 1919, Huffine settled in Binghamton, New York, playing tuba in the Endicott-Johnson Shoe Factory band, as well as filling in on trumpet, trombone, and string bass (based on information from Endicott-Johnson Co).

Huffine died in Binghamton on February 12, 1947. The Endicott-Johnson shoe band, of which Getty Huffine was a member at the time of his death, played his march "Them Basses" at the graveside.

Compositions
Basses on a Rampage March - pub. Karl King 1927
The Bear Cat March - pub. C.L. Barnhouse 1924
Dull Razor Blues - pub. Karl King 1929
I B M March - pub. Karl King 1928
The Last Word march - pub. C.L. Barnhouse 1928
The Syncopator March - pub. Karl King 1929
Them Basses March - pub. Fillmore 1924
Triple Cities March - pub. King 1930 (Binghamton, Endicott, Johnson City)

References

Additional sources
Bierley, Paul Edmund: Heritage Encyclopedia of Band Music (info from L. Geiger)
Geiger, Loren: Boombah Herald Newsletter
Hoe, Robert - producer of Heritage of the March record series

1889 births
1947 deaths
20th-century American composers
20th-century American male musicians
20th-century classical composers
20th-century classical trombonists
American classical composers
American classical trombonists
American classical tubists
American male classical composers
Male trombonists
Musicians from Bowling Green, Kentucky